Powelliphanta spedeni, known as one of the amber snails, is a species of large, carnivorous land snail, a terrestrial pulmonate gastropod mollusc in the family Rhytididae.

Distribution
This species is endemic to the South Island of New Zealand. There are two subspecies:

 Powelliphanta spedeni spedeni Powell, 1932
 Powelliphanta spedeni lateumbilicata Powell, 1946

Description 
The shell of Powelliphanta spedeni reaches a maximum size of 40 mm.

Life cycle 
Powelliphanta spedeni produces an egg up to the size of 11.5 mm. Shape of the eggs is oval and seldom constant in dimensions 11.5 × 9 mm, 11 × 9 mm, 9 × 7.75 mm. Its eggs are laid in March.

References

Powelliphanta
Gastropods described in 1932
Taxa named by Arthur William Baden Powell
Endemic fauna of New Zealand
Endemic molluscs of New Zealand